Ingegerd Wärnersson (born 1947) was a Swedish politician of the Swedish Social Democratic Party. She served as Deputy Minister for Education in 1998–2002. She was a Member of the Riksdag in 1988–1991and 1994–2002. She was Governor of Blekinge County in 2002-2008.

References

1947 births
20th-century Swedish politicians
20th-century Swedish women politicians
Women government ministers of Sweden
Swedish Ministers for Agriculture
21st-century Swedish women politicians
Living people